Pico da Tijuca is a mountain in the city of Rio de Janeiro, Brazil.

Description
The mountain is the most prominent peak of the Rio de Janeiro City urban zone. Pico da Tijuca is part of the  Tijuca National Park protected area, established in 1961. There are stairs cut in the rock to reach the top of the peak.

See also 
List of mountains in Brazil

References

External links

Mountains of Brazil
Geography of Rio de Janeiro (city)

fr:Pic de Tijuca